AGDC can refer to:
 Alaska Gasline Development Corp

 Alaska Geographic Data Committee
 Alaska Geospatial Data Clearinghouse
 Advanced General Dentistry Clinic
 American Gage Design Committee
 Antarctic Glaciological Data Center
 Australian Game Developers Conference

 Australian Geoscience Data Cube
 Automatic Garbage Detection and Collection